Anthony Leone may refer to:

Anthony Leone (fighter)
Tony Leone (musician)

See also
 Antonio Leone (disambiguation)
 Tony Leone (disambiguation)